Leon Eugene Gonzalez III (born September 21, 1963) is a former American football wide receiver in the National Football League (NFL) for the Dallas Cowboys and Atlanta Falcons. He played college football at Bethune-Cookman University.

Early years
Gonzalez attended Jean Ribault High School, where he practiced football, basketball and track. He was a teammate of future NFL wide receiver Kelvin Martin.

He accepted a football scholarship from Bethune-Cookman University. As a freshman, his teammates gave him the nickname "Speedy" Gonzalez. As a junior, he became a starter, registering 43 receptions for 718 yards and 6 touchdowns.

As a senior, he led the MEAC in receiving with 56 receptions for 941 yards and 9 touchdowns. He also contributed to the team winning the Mideastern Athletic Conference Division championship.

Professional career

Dallas Cowboys
Gonzalez was selected by the Dallas Cowboys in the eighth round (216th overall) of the 1985 NFL Draft. He was also selected by the Orlando Renegades in the eleventh round (147th overall) of the 1985 USFL Draft. As a rookie, he was a backup wide receiver behind Mike Renfro and also returned punts. He finished with 3 receptions for 28 yards and 15 punt returns for 58 yards (3.9-yard avg.). He was waived on December 5 to be placed on the injured reserve list with a Bunion condition, and to make room for Gordon Banks. He was released on August 23, 1986.

Tampa Bay Buccaneers
In May 1987, he signed as a free agent with the Tampa Bay Buccaneers. He was released before the start of the season.

Atlanta Falcons
After the NFLPA strike was declared on the third week of the 1987 season, those contests were canceled (reducing the 16 game season to 15) and the NFL decided that the games would be played with replacement players. Gonzalez was signed in September to be a part of the Atlanta Falcons replacement team. He was a backup at wide receiver. He appeared in 2 games, posting 3 receptions for 40 yards. He was cut on October 19, at the end of the strike.

References

1963 births
Living people
Players of American football from Jacksonville, Florida
American football wide receivers
Bethune–Cookman Wildcats football players
Dallas Cowboys players
Atlanta Falcons players
National Football League replacement players